Harrison David Ward (born 25 October 1999) is an English cricketer. He made his Twenty20 debut on 1 July 2021, for Sussex in the 2021 T20 Blast. Prior to his Twenty20 debut, Ward had previously been selected to represent the England under-19 cricket team. He made his first-class debut on 11 July 2021, for Sussex in the 2021 County Championship. He made his List A debut on 23 July 2021, for Sussex in the 2021 Royal London One-Day Cup.

References

External links
 

1999 births
Living people
English cricketers
Sussex cricketers
Cricketers from Oxford
Oxfordshire cricketers